The 2011–12 Kentucky Wildcats men's basketball team represented the University of Kentucky in the 2011–12  college basketball season. The team's head coach was John Calipari, who was in his third season after taking the Wildcats to their first Final Four in thirteen seasons. The team won the 2012 NCAA Championship, bringing Kentucky its eighth title. The team's 38 wins broke a record shared by 5 teams for the most wins in NCAA men's Division I history.

Pre-season

Departures
Former Wildcats Josh Harrellson, Brandon Knight and DeAndre Liggins were all selected in the 2011 NBA draft. Knight was taken No. 8 overall by the Detroit Pistons, Harrellson was selected No. 45 overall by the New Orleans Pelicans while the Oklahoma City Thunder selected Liggins at No. 53. The trio increased UK's total under John Calipari to 8 players selected in the Draft, including 6 in the first round.

Class of 2011 signees
For the third consecutive season the Wildcats boasted the No. 1 recruiting class. Anthony Davis, Michael Kidd-Gilchrist, Marquis Teague, Kyle Wiltjer formed the four-member freshman class for the 2011-12 season.
Davis was the nation's consensus No. 1 overall player
Kidd-Gilchrist was the nation's consensus No. 1 small forward
Teague was the nation's consensus No. 1 point guard, the fourth straight for John Calipari

Class of 2012 signees

Roster

Jon Hood and Ryan Harrow redshirted this season—Hood due to a torn ACL, and Harrow as a transfer from North Carolina State. Both were eligible for the 2012–13 college basketball season.
Sam Malone missed much of the season to a torn ACL.

Depth chart

Schedule and results

|-
!colspan=12 style="background:#005DAA; color:white;"| Exhibition

|-
!colspan=12 style="background:#005DAA; color:white;"| Regular Season

|-
!colspan=12 style="background:#005DAA; color:white;"| SEC Tournament

|-
!colspan=12 style="background:#005DAA; color:white;"| NCAA tournament

Rankings

Accomplishments

Players drafted into the NBA

Overall
NCAA Champions, 8th in school history
SEC Regular Season Champions
Hall of Fame Tip-Off Classic Champions
38 victories is the most in NCAA history
15th Final Four appearance and 2nd in two years
16–0 in SEC play
19–0 at home
3rd consecutive NCAA Tournament
344 blocks is the most in NCAA single season history
Anthony Davis set NCAA Freshman block record with 186

Team highs
Most Points Scored: 108 vs. Marist, 11/11
Highest Point Differential: 50 vs. Marist, 11/11
Most Field Goals Made: 46 vs. Marist, 11/11
Most Three Point Field Goals Made: 15 vs Georgia, 3/1
Most Free Throws Made: 35 vs. Indiana, 3/23
Most Rebounds: 57 vs. Louisville, 12/31
Most Assists: 24 vs. Marist, 11/11
Highest Assist-to-Turnover Ratio: 5.0 vs. Portland, 11/26 (20 assists to 4 turnovers)
Most Blocks: 18 vs. St. John's, 12/1

Individual highs
Most Points: 28, Anthony Davis vs. Vanderbilt, 2/25
Most Rebounds: 19, Michael Kidd-Gilchrist vs. Louisville 12/31
Most Three-Point Field Goals Made: 5, Doron Lamb vs. Iowa State (3/17) and Darius Miller vs. Georgia (3/1)
Most Assists: 10, Marquis Teague vs. Florida, 2/7
Most Steals: 4, Anthony Davis vs. Alabama, 1/21
Most Blocks: 9, Anthony Davis vs. South Carolina, 2/4

Individual awards
2012 National Player of the Year: Anthony Davis (AP, Naismith, Robertson, Rupp, TSN, Wooden)
2012 SEC Player of the Year: Anthony Davis
2012 Consensus All-Americans: Anthony Davis (First Team), Michael Kidd-Gilchrist (Second Team)
2012 NCAA Tournament Most Outstanding Player: Anthony Davis
2012 All-SEC: Anthony Davis (First Team), Michael Kidd-Gilchrist (First Team), Terrence Jones (Second Team), Doron Lamb (Second Team)
2012 National Defensive Player of the Year: Anthony Davis (Driesell, NABC)
2012 Pete Newell Big Man Award: Anthony Davis
2012 SEC Freshman of the Year: Anthony Davis

References

Kentucky Wildcats men's basketball seasons
Kentucky
Kentucky
NCAA Division I men's basketball tournament Final Four seasons
NCAA Division I men's basketball tournament championship seasons
Kentucky Wildcats men's basketball
Kentucky Wildcats men's basketball